Paolo Bucci (born 23 July 1968) is an Italian gymnast. He competed at the 1988 Summer Olympics, the 1992 Summer Olympics and the 1996 Summer Olympics.

References

1968 births
Living people
Italian male artistic gymnasts
Olympic gymnasts of Italy
Gymnasts at the 1988 Summer Olympics
Gymnasts at the 1992 Summer Olympics
Gymnasts at the 1996 Summer Olympics
Gymnasts from Milan